Heinz Hemmi (23 November 1899 – February 1985) was a Swiss sprinter. He competed in the men's 4 × 100 metres relay at the 1924 Summer Olympics.

References

External links
 

1899 births
1985 deaths
Athletes (track and field) at the 1924 Summer Olympics
Swiss male sprinters
Olympic athletes of Switzerland
Place of birth missing